Melese amastris is a moth of the family Erebidae. It was described by Herbert Druce in 1884. It is found in Mexico, Guatemala, Honduras, Costa Rica and Brazil.

References

 

Melese
Moths described in 1884